Fate: The Traitor Soul is an action role-playing video game developed by WildTangent and released on September 9, 2009, as the second standalone expansion to the 2005 PC game, Fate, with the first one being Fate: Undiscovered Realms released in 2008.

Fate: The Traitor Soul is a fantasy action role-playing game in which players take their characters through progressively difficult levels of a dungeon while fighting monsters, completing quests, and collecting valuable items and gold. Players earn experience points that boost character attributes and unlock new levels and weapons.

Plot
The player character takes up the challenge of a mysterious Traveler in the Temple of Fate and must defeat the Nemesis along with its minion called the Phur, in the depths of a dungeon called the Chamber of Trials.

In addition to the human character from previous Fate games, the player also has the option to select an Orc, a Cogger (a steampunk-inspired cyborg), or a Shadow Elf warrior as their player character.

Gameplay
The gameplay is similar to that of previous installments of the series with the addition of some new features. The three new player character races include intrinsic stat bonuses. Cosmetically different pets are included, adding a fox, boar and mechanical wasp to the original selection of dog and cat. New items such as capes and earrings are added, as are new spells and monsters.

Notable interface changes include the addition of an inventory auto-sort button and the ability to switch between two sets of equipped weapons.

In addition to the new Chamber of Trials dungeon, the towns and dungeons from Fate: Undiscovered Realms are included in a mostly unaltered state.  Also appearing in boxed versions are the town and dungeon of Grove from the first game, again in a mostly unaltered state.

References

External links
 WildGames website

2009 video games
Role-playing video games
Action role-playing video games
Video games developed in the United States
Video games featuring protagonists of selectable gender
Windows games
Windows-only games
WildTangent games
Video games using procedural generation
Dungeon crawler video games
Single-player video games
Encore Software games